Visa requirements for Liechtenstein citizens are administrative entry restrictions by the authorities of other states placed on citizens of Liechtenstein. As of 13 April 2021, Liechtenstein citizens had visa-free or visa on arrival access to 179 countries and territories, ranking the Liechtenstein passport 12th (tied with Malaysia) in terms of travel freedom overall, and the lowest of the EFTA member states, according to the Henley Passport Index.

As a member state of the European Free Trade Association (EFTA), Liechtenstein citizens enjoy freedom of movement to live and work in other EFTA countries in accordance with the EFTA convention. Moreover, by virtue of Liechtenstein's membership of the European Economic Area (EEA), Liechtenstein citizens also enjoy freedom of movement within all EEA member states. The Citizens’ Rights Directive defines the right of free movement for citizens of the EEA, and all EFTA and EU citizens are not only visa-exempt but are legally entitled to enter and reside in each other's countries.

In order to travel to another country, a Liechtenstein citizen requires a passport, except travel to all European Union member states, all EFTA member states, Albania, Andorra, Bosnia and Herzegovina, Monaco, Montenegro, North Macedonia, San Marino, Serbia, Turkey, and Vatican City where the Liechtenstein identity card is valid.

Visa requirements map

Visa requirements

Dependent, disputed, or restricted territories

Visa requirements for Liechtenstein citizens for visits to various territories, disputed areas, partially recognized countries and restricted zones:

Consular protection of Liechtensteinian citizens abroad

There are Liechtensteinian embassies in Austria, Belgium, Germany, Switzerland, and the United States of America.

Since 1919, Switzerland has represented Liechtenstein in those countries wherein Liechtenstein itself does not maintain consular representation.

See also List of diplomatic missions of Liechtenstein.

Non-visa restrictions

See also

 Liechtenstein passport
Visa requirements for EFTA nationals
 Visa policy of the Schengen Area

Notes and references
Notes

References

Foreign relations of Liechtenstein
Liechtenstein